The 1945 Michigan State Spartans football team represented Michigan State College as an independent during the 1945 college football season. In their 12th season under head coach Charlie Bachman, the Spartans compiled a 5–3–1 record. The Spartans lost their annual rivalry game with Michigan by a 40 to 0 score. In intersectional play, the Spartans beat Kentucky (7–6), Pittsburgh (12–7), and Penn State (33–0), but lost to the Miami Hurricanes (21-7).

Schedule

Game summaries

Michigan

On September 29, 1945, Michigan State lost to Michigan by a 40 to 0 score. Michigan's six touchdowns were scored by Dan Dworsky (one-yard run in first quarter), Donovan Hershberger (touchdown pass from Joe Ponsetto), Bob Nussbaumer (three-yard run in second quarter), Wally Teninga (three-yard run in third quarter and another touchdown run in the fourth quarter), and Wesley Muelder (10-yard interception return for touchdown). Ponsetto kicked four points after touchdown and completed three of four passes for 89 yards, including the touchdown throw to Hershberger. Michigan gained 274 rushing yards and 128 yards passing, outpacing the Spartans who were limited to 37 rushing yards and 48 passing yards. Michigan's rushing leaders were Dworsky (16 carries for 64 yards) and Nussbaumer (8 carries for 60 yards).

References

Michigan State
Michigan State Spartans football seasons
Michigan State Spartans football